Highland Park Stadium, also known as CFD Investments Stadium, is a minor league baseball stadium located in the Highland Park in Kokomo, Indiana, United States

History
Highland Park Stadium was built as the home of the Kokomo Giants in 1955, and then Kokomo Dodgers from 1956 to 1961. The stadium generally holds 3,000 people, but findable records show 7,000 people attended a game in 1961. The stadium received its first renovation in 1985, which added most of the bleachers that are there today. 1985 was also when it hosted a minor league world series game. The stadium is due for another renovation in 2014; however, it is unclear what exactly will be redone with the stadium. Currently the stadium is just used for local games such as high school baseball teams, and the mayor, Greg Goodnight, has stated he doesn't foresee any upcoming teams in Kokomo, although he would like to see one.

Tenants
Kokomo Giants (1955)
Kokomo Dodgers (1956–1961)

References

External links
https://archive.today/20131218011454/http://www.cityofkokomo.org/main.asp?SectionID=50&TM=72029.8

Minor league baseball venues
Baseball venues in Indiana
1955 establishments in Indiana
Sports venues completed in 1955
Sports in Kokomo, Indiana
High school baseball venues in the United States
Mississippi-Ohio Valley League
Defunct Midwest League ballparks